Thomas Cornell Sr (c. 1595 – c. 1655) was one of the earliest settlers of Boston (1638), Rhode Island (1643) and the Bronx and a contemporary of Roger Williams and the family of Anne Hutchinson. He is the ancestor of a number of North Americans prominent in business, politics, and education.

Biography
Cornell was born and christened 24 March 1591/92 in Saffron Walden, Essex, England and died in Portsmouth, Rhode Island on 8 February 1654/55. He married Rebecca Briggs, born in 1600, on 9 June 1620 at St Mary The Virgin, Saffron Walden.  First two sons were Richard Cornell (1624-1694) and William Cornell (1627-1673). Their son named Thomas Cornell (Jr.) was born October, 1627 in Saffron Walden, Essex, England. Thomas Cornell and his family immigrated from England to Boston in 1638 when their son Thomas Cornell (Jr.) would have been age 11.

Thomas Cornell was an innkeeper in Boston who was part of the Peripheral Group in the Antinomian Controversy, a religious and political conflict in the Massachusetts Bay Colony from 1636 to 1638. Cornell sold his inn in 1643 and left for Rhode Island, where others from the Antinomian Controversy had settled in 1638 after being ordered to leave the Massachusetts Bay Colony.

Cornell became friends with Roger Williams and co-founded the village of Westchester north of New Amsterdam (later New York City) in 1643. He returned to Rhode Island in 1644 and obtained a land grant for 100 acres in Portsmouth, RI on Aquidneck Island that became the Cornell homestead. His neighbor was Edward Hutchison, a son of Anne Hutchinson from the Antinomian Controversy.

In 1646, Cornell was granted a patent on an area of about four square miles that later became part of The Bronx. It was bounded by Westchester Creek, the Bronx River, village of Westchester and the East River and was called Cornell's Neck. The area is now known as Clason Point.

Murder trial of Thomas Cornell Jr.
Thomas' son Thomas Cornell (Jr.) was accused, tried, convicted and hanged for the alleged murder of his mother, Rebecca Cornell, in Portsmouth in 1673.  He was convicted using circumstantial evidence as well as spectral evidence, where witnesses recounted dreams involving ghosts pointing to his alleged guilt.  American jurisprudence was later modernized to exclude the use of apparitions and dreams as evidence in trials. This case and its history has been chronicled in the book Killed Strangely: The Death of Rebecca Cornell (2002) by Elaine Forman Crane.

Notable descendants
Thomas Cornell is an ancestor to a number of prominent and notorious Americans, Ezra Cornell, founder of Cornell University; William Ellery, signer of the Declaration of Independence; Ezekiel Cornell, a Revolutionary War general who represented Rhode Island in the U.S. Continental Congress from 1780 to 1782; Bill Gates; Presidents Jimmy Carter and Richard Nixon; First Ladies Elizabeth Monroe and Frances Folsom Cleveland; Senator Bob Graham; Secretary of State John Kerry; Amelia Earhart; Josh Rosen; neuroscientist and self-described psychopath James H. Fallon; and accused axe murderer Lizzie Borden, by way of Thomas Cornell (Jr.)'s daughter, Innocent, born to his second wife, Sarah Earle Cornell, after his execution.

Thomas Cornell (Jr.) fourth-great-grandson of the original Thomas, donated the original endowment for Cornell University, which is named after another descendant of Thomas. That man was Ezra Cornell (1807-1874), son of Elijah, born 1771, son of Elijah, born 1730, son of Stephen, who married Ruth Pierce, son of Stephen, born 1656, son of Thomas-the-executed and his first wife, Elizabeth Fiscock.

Cornell is also connected to distant Canadian lines, who settled north into Upper Canada, notably in Scarborough, Ontario and Markham, Ontario via William Cornell (1766-1860) from Rhode Island. He is also linked to Sir Robert Laird Borden, Prime Minister of Canada via Richard Borden's marriage to Innocent Cornell.

References

People from colonial Boston
1595 births
People from the Bronx
People of the Province of New York
People of colonial Rhode Island
People from Portsmouth, Rhode Island
Kingdom of England emigrants to Massachusetts Bay Colony
Cornell family
People from Saffron Walden
1655 deaths